The Formula 4 United States Championship is an auto racing series that is held under FIA Formula 4 regulations. The championship is sanctioned by SCCA Pro Racing, the professional racing division of the Sports Car Club of America, in conjunction with the Automobile Competition Committee for the United States, the United States representative to the FIA. It is a spec series, with all competitors using the same chassis and engine.

The championship is designed to support North American drivers entering international open-wheel racing, by using the same regulations used by other series globally, rather than compete with existing INDYCAR Road to Indy ladder, with the drivers earning points towards an FIA Superlicence. It serves as an initial step into car racing for drivers graduating from karting.

Championship format 
Each event of the championship consists of three races, which are run on the support package of other motorsport events in the United States and starting in 2017, Canada. The inaugural season consisted of five events, and expanded to additional rounds in the following seasons. Initially only run at race tracks on the East Coast of the United States, the championship will expand to separate East and West Coast series in the future with Canadian rounds in association with United States-based series.

The chassis is provided by Onroak Automotive, with a 2000cc Honda K20 detuned to 160hp and supplied by Honda Performance Development, which both meet the FIA price caps for Formula 4. The tyres were by provided by Pirelli until 2018 season and by Hankook since 2019, and are similarly price capped. The total cost for a driver to compete in a full season of the 2016 championship is estimated at $115,000.

Champions

Drivers

Teams

Circuits

Notes

References

External links
 

 
Auto racing series in the United States
Formula racing series
Formula 4 series
One-make series
Recurring sporting events established in 2016